Duqqa, du'ah, do'a, or dukkah is an Egyptian and Middle Eastern condiment consisting of a mixture of herbs, nuts (usually hazelnut), and spices. It is typically used as a dip with bread or fresh vegetables for an hors d'œuvre. Pre-made versions of duqqa can be bought in the spice markets of Cairo, where they are sold in paper cones, with the simplest version being crushed mint, salt, and pepper. The packaged variety that is found in markets is composed of parched wheat flour mixed with cumin and caraway. In the Hejaz region it has been part of the regional cuisine for decades.

Etymology
The word is derived from the Arabic for "to pound" since the mixture of spices and nuts is pounded together after being dry roasted to a texture that is neither powdered nor paste-like.  The actual composition of the spice mix can vary from family to family, vendor to vendor though there are common ingredients, such as sesame, coriander, cumin, salt and black pepper.  Reference to a 19th-century text lists marjoram, mint, zaatar and chickpeas as further ingredients that can be used in the mixture.  A report from 1978 indicates that even further ingredients can be used, such as nigella, millet flour and dried cheese. Some modern variants include pine nuts, pumpkin seeds or sunflower seeds.

Internationally
Duqqa is now becoming popular in some countries outside Egypt. In the United States it has gained exposure through such TV shows as Top Chef, Chopped and Iron Chef America. In Australia, several companies now make it in a variety of flavours. It has become popular in the past ten years, probably due to recent Lebanese and Arabic immigration as well as television cooking shows such as SBS Food Network. It can be found in supermarkets, specialty stores and many farmers' markets.

See also

 List of Middle Eastern dishes
 List of African dishes
 Charoset

Notes

References

Arab cuisine
Dips (food)
Egyptian cuisine
Palestinian cuisine
Condiments
Herb and spice mixtures
Middle Eastern cuisine